Colonel John William Hessing (5 November 1739 – 21 July 1803) was a Dutch military officer who served in the armies of the Maratha Empire in the late 18th and early 19th centuries.

Biography 
Hessing commanded 3,000 Maratha regular troops in the Battle of Kharda, where the Maratha armies defeated the Nizam of Hyderabad on 12 March 1795. In June 1801 Hessing commanded four battalions outside Ujjain, which were attacked and defeated by Yashwantrao Holkar, the Maratha ruler of Indore. Hessing served in the Maratha armies against the East India Company in the Second Anglo-Maratha War.

Due to ill health, he resigned his command of four battalions in 1800, being succeeded by his son, George Hessing, who was then 18.
He took instead a position as Commandant of Agra Fort, and died in Agra on 21 July 1803 while in command of the Maratha forces there.

Tomb

John Hessing's tomb is located in the Padretola, or Padresanto, a Christian cemetery in Agra. The tomb was commissioned by Hessing's wife, Anne:

The tomb of John Hessing, hard by, is a still more splendid edifice, being a copy, in red sandstone, of the famous Taj Mahal, and on a pretty extensive scale too, though far smaller than the original. The tomb, which was completed in or about the year of the British conquest, bears an inscription in good English, setting forth that the deceased colonel was a Dutchman, who died Commandant of Agra, in his 63rd year, 21 July 1803, just before Lake's successful siege of the place.*

References

Keene, H. G. (1887) The Fall of the Moghul Empire of Hindustan.

External links
Red Taj: Tomb of Col John Hessing 

1803 deaths
People of the Maratha Empire
People from Agra
People from Utrecht (province)
Year of birth uncertain
1739 births
Europeans in India
Dutch mercenaries
Mercenaries in India